The 2019–20 Jaguar I-Pace eTrophy was the second and final season of the battery electric zero-emission international motor racing series supporting the FIA Formula E Championship, which started in November 2019 and ended in August 2020. The series saw entrants compete in a race-prepared Jaguar I-PACE, built by Jaguar's Special Vehicle Operations team with technical support from M-Sport, with the races taking place on selected Formula E weekends.

Teams and drivers

Driver changes
 Alice Powell joined the grid as a full-time driver, formerly competing in the inaugural race as a VIP driver.
 Fahad Algosaibi and Mashhur Bal Hejaila replaced the reigning Pro-Am Champion Bandar Alesayi and Ahmed Bin-Khanen at Saudi Racing.
 Sun Chao replaced Ziyi Zhang at Jaguar China Racing.

Team changes
 Rahal Letterman Lanigan Racing, who previously competed in the Pro class, will not return to the series.
 Team Germany has moved to the Pro class after replacing Célia Martin with Alice Powell.

Mid-season changes
 Mário Haberfeld replaced Cacá Bueno in the opening race weekend in Diriyah. Bueno returned in the following round.
 A new Japanese entry dubbed 'Team Yokohama Challenge' will field Takuma Aoki, the first disabled person to compete in an international electric race series, starting with round three at Autódromo Hermanos Rodríguez in Mexico City.
 ZEG  Jaguar Brazil expanded their entry to three cars prior to the Mexico City ePrix and added Adalberto Baptista to their lineup.
 Jaguar China Racing couldn't fly its standard driver lineup to Mexico City due to the COVID-19 pandemic, which forced the team to replace them with David Cheng and a local driver Manuel Cabrera.
 The rescheduled Berlin ePrix saw Sun Chao, Yaqi Zhang (Jaguar China Racing) and Mashhur Bal Hejaila (Saudi Racing) missing the event, with the respective teams using replacement drivers.

Calendar

Calendar changes
 The Diriyah ePrix was expanded to two races.
 The Monaco ePrix did not return for this season as the event is run biennially.
 The Hong Kong ePrix, scheduled for 1 March, was scrapped due to political protests in the city. The event was supposed to be replaced by the returning Sanya ePrix.
 Any races scheduled after 1 March 2020 were initially postponed and then cancelled due to the COVID-19 pandemic until it was announced that the Berlin ePrix will host all of the remaining races in August.

Regulation changes

Technical regulations
 The "attack mode" system would be adopted from the parent series after successful trials were completed in New York City in July 2019.

Pre-season
On 3 October 2019, Mark Turner was announced as the series' championship manager. Turner was formerly involved in the Audi R8 LMS Cup, Formula BMW and the SEAT Cupra Championship. The new VIP car was unveiled on the same day, now sporting a black-dominated livery with cyan accents. Pre-season testing began on 28 October at the Bedford Autodrome.

Results and standings

Drivers' Championship
Points were awarded to the top ten classified finishers in every race, and the pole position starter in each class, using the following structure:

† – Driver did not finish the race, but was classified as he completed over 90% of the race distance.
‡ – Qualification was not held, therefore, no extra point was given for pole position.

See also
 Formula E
 Electric Production Car Series
 Electric motorsport

Footnotes

References

External links
 

Jaguar
Jaguar
I-Pace eTrophy
One-make series
Green racing